Mooselookmeguntic is a populated place in Franklin County, Maine, United States. The community is on the east shore of the north end of Mooselookmeguntic Lake, where it merges with Cupsuptic Lake. It is part of the Rangeley Lakes region of northwestern Maine.

Mooselookmeguntic is one of the longest single-word, unhyphenated place names in the United States recognized by the U.S. Board on Geographic Names. At 17 characters, it is tied with Kleinfeltersville, Pennsylvania.

Geology of Mooselookmeguntic 

A publication of the Maine Geological Survey describes some of the bedrock just south of Lake Mooselookmeguntic as:
"Mooselookmeguntic pluton and related bodies. Primarily a medium-grained, two mica adamellite. Some pegmatite."

References

Unincorporated communities in Franklin County, Maine
Unincorporated communities in Maine
Villages in Franklin County, Maine